Dry Creek is a stream in Lincoln and Warren counties of the U.S. state of Missouri. It is a tributary of Big Creek. A variant name was "Dry Branch".

Dry Creek was so named because it often is dry.

See also
List of rivers of Missouri

References

Rivers of Lincoln County, Missouri
Rivers of Warren County, Missouri
Rivers of Missouri